Drug and Therapeutics Bulletin is a monthly scientific journal with evaluations of, and practical advice on, individual treatments and the overall management of disease. The journal is published by the BMJ Group and as a founder member of The International Society of Drug Bulletins, the journal is also completely independent of the pharmaceutical industry, government and regulatory authorities, advertising and other forms of commercial sponsorship.

History
The first editor was Andrew Herxheimer, followed by Joe Collier, who took on the role in 1992, retiring from it in 2002.

References

External links
 

English-language journals
Pharmacology journals
Monthly journals
BMJ Group academic journals